Pseudocenoceras is an extinct genus of nautilus-like molluscs.

References

External links 

Prehistoric cephalopod genera
Tithonian genus first appearances
Berriasian genera
Valanginian genera
Hauterivian genera
Barremian genera
Aptian genera
Albian genera
Cenomanian genera
Turonian genera
Coniacian genera
Santonian genera
Campanian genera
Maastrichtian genus extinctions